Henri Frédéric Schopin (12 June 1804 - 21 October 1880) was the winner of the Prix de Rome for painting in 1831.

References

External links 

1804 births
1880 deaths
19th-century French painters